Bibliotheca Corviniana was one of the most renowned libraries of the Renaissance world, established by Matthias Corvinus, King of Hungary, in Buda Castle between 1458 and 1490. The books were transferred to Istanbul after the Hungarian defeat by the Ottomans in the Battle of Mohács in 1526.

History
Matthias, one of the most powerful rulers of the age, started to collect the books from about 1460. At the king's death in 1490, the library consisted of about 3,000 codices or "Corvinae" which included about four to five thousand various works, many of classical Greek and Latin authors. It represented the literary production and reflected the state of knowledge and arts of the Renaissance and included works of philosophy, theology, history, law, literature, geography, natural sciences, medicine, architecture, and many others. The codices moved to Istanbul after the Turkish conquest of Hungary in the 16th century. Only about 216 Corvinae survived, today preserved in several libraries in Hungary and Europe.

North of the Alps, Matthias' library was the largest in Europe, and its vast contents was only second to the Vatican Library in the whole of Europe, according to contemporary accounts. It was the greatest collection of science writings in its time. In 1489, Bartolomeo della Fonte of Florence wrote that Lorenzo de Medici founded his own Greek-Latin library encouraged by the example of the Hungarian king.

Nearly two thirds of the surviving volumes had not been printed before the king's death. Some of them contained the sole copy of the works in them, like the book of Constantine Porphyrogennetos on the habits in the court of the Byzantine emperor, or the church history of Nikephoros Kallistos. Some lost Corvinae works are also known, with which the only copy of ancient books perished, including the full works of Hypereides, and writings by Flavius Cresconius Corippus, Procopius, as well as by Matthias' contemporary  Cuspinianus.

Hungary's National Széchényi Library is working on projects to restore the Corvina library in digital form.

Items from the Bibliotheca Corviniana were inscribed on UNESCO’s Memory of the World Register in 2005 in recognition of their historical significance.

References

Further reading
 Csapodi, Csaba & Csapodiné Gárdonyi, Klára: Bibliotheca Corviniana (Budapest, 1976.)

External links
 The Carbo codex from the collection of the Library and Information Centre, Hungarian Academy of Sciences

Libraries in Hungary
15th-century establishments in Europe
Memory of the World Register
Libraries established in the 15th century